Two warships of Sweden have been named Valen, after Valen:

 , a submarine launched in 1925 and stricken in 1944.
 , a  launched in 1955 and stricken in 1980.

Swedish Navy ship names